Baboon Strength is a 2008 album by jazz guitarist Charlie Hunter.

"I brought some decent songs and tried not to overplay. It's a never-ending process," said Hunter of the record. It marks the culmination of Hunter's more eclectic fusion recordings; future records would follow a more straightforward blues/R&B pattern. All songs were recorded live to 16-inch analog tape before being mixed digitally.

Track listing
All songs written by Charlie Hunter.

"Athens" – 2:43
"Astronaut Love Triangle" – 4:53
"Difford-Tilbrook" – 4:05
"Welcome to Frankfurt" – 3:13
"A Song for Karen Carpenter" – 5:53
"Baboon Strength" – 5:32
"Fine Corinthian Leather" – 6:05
"Porter-Hayes" – 5:02
"AbadabA" – 7:10

Personnel 
 Charlie Hunter – seven-string guitar
 Tony Mason – drums
 Erik Deutsch – keyboards

Production
 Charlie Hunter – producer
 Dave McNair – mastering

References

2008 albums
Charlie Hunter albums